Nguyễn Anh Hùng (born 8 June 1992) is a Vietnamese footballer who plays as a full-back for V.League 1 club Hải Phòng.

References 

Vietnamese footballers
Association football defenders
V.League 1 players
1992 births
Living people
People from Nghệ An province
Haiphong FC players